Tuff Trax was a popular syndicated television show featuring monster trucks and tractor pulling.  The show first aired in 1989 and was one hour long, split between TNT Motorsports' pulling and monsters.  The original hosts were Army Armstrong and Scott Douglass, with Kris Chapman later added as a pit reporter.  Soon the show began focusing on the monster trucks and would use the entire hour to do so.  There were a few weekly segments on each episode:

Crunch of the Week - a crash from either a previously aired event, the event televised, or a non-televised event.
Power Play - sponsored by Nintendo, a wild moment from the current event, later renamed Power Drive in 1991.
Monster Smash - the final round of racing, preceded by ominous Jaws-like music and special effects. This part appeared on the TNT version only.

When the United States Hot Rod Association bought TNT they decided to keep the show but replaced Douglass and Armstrong with their announcer Bret Kepner.  The USHRA edition of Tuff Trax aired four shows in 1991, then later renamed Super Trax. Scott Douglass went on to replace Kepner as the main host in late 1991. For the 1992 season, the host was Tom Baldrick, but Douglass remained as the play-by-play commentator. Monster Wars was to replace it two years later.

Monster truck television shows